Duplex stainless steels are a family of stainless steels. These are called duplex (or austenitic-ferritic) grades because their metallurgical structure consists of two phases, austenite (face-centered cubic lattice) and ferrite (body centered cubic lattice) in roughly equal proportions. They are designed to provide better corrosion resistance, particularly chloride stress corrosion and chloride pitting corrosion, and higher strength than standard austenitic stainless steels such as Type 304 or 316. The main differences in composition, when compared with an austenitic stainless steel is that the duplex steels have a higher chromium content, 20–28%; higher molybdenum, up to 5%; lower nickel, up to 9% and 0.05–0.50% nitrogen. Both the low nickel content and the high strength (enabling thinner sections to be used) give significant cost benefits. They are therefore used extensively in the offshore oil and gas industry for pipework systems, manifolds, risers, etc. and in the petrochemical industry in the form of pipelines and pressure vessels. In addition to the improved corrosion resistance compared with the 300 series stainless steels duplex steels also have higher strength.

Grades of duplex stainless steels 

Duplex stainless steels are usually divided into three groups based on their pitting corrosion resistance, characterised by the pitting resistance equivalence number, .

 Standard duplex (PREN range 28–38) Typically Grade EN 1.4462 (also called 2205). It is typical of the mid-range of properties and is perhaps the most used today
 Super-duplex (PREN range 38-45) Typically grade EN 1.4410 up to so-called hyper duplex grades (PREN: >45) developed later to meet specific demands of the oil and gas as well as those of the chemical industries. They offer a superior corrosion resistance  and strength  but are more difficult to process because the higher contents of Cr, Mo, N and even W promote the formation of  intermetallic phases, which reduce drastically the impact resistance of the steel. Faulty processing will result in poor performance and users are advised to deal with reputable suppliers/processors. Applications include deepwater offshore oil production.
 Lean duplex grades (PREN range 22–27) Typically grade EN 1.4362, have been developed more recently for less demanding applications, particularly in the building and construction industry.  Their corrosion  resistance is closer to that of the standard austenitic grade EN 1.4401 (with a plus on resistance to stress corrosion cracking) and their mechanical properties are higher. This can be a great advantage when strength is important. This is the case in bridges,  pressure vessels or tie bars.

Chemical compositions 

Chemicals composition of grades from EN 10088-1 (2014) Standard are given in the table below:

Mechanical properties 
Mechanical properties from European Standard EN 10088-3 (2014) (for product thickness below 160mm):

*for thickness ≤ 

The minimum yield stress values are about twice as high as those of austenitic stainless steels.

Duplex grades are therefore attractive when mechanical properties at room temperature are important because they allow thinner sections.

475 °C embrittlement 

Duplex stainless is widely used in the industry because it possesses excellent oxidation resistance but can have limited toughness due to its large ferritic grain size, and they have hardened, and embrittlement tendencies at temperatures ranging from 280–500 °C, especially at 475 °C, where spinodal decomposition of the supersaturated solid ferrite solution into Fe-rich nanophase and Cr-rich nanophase, accompanied by G-phase precipitation, occurs, which makes the ferrite phase a preferential initiation site for micro-cracks.

Heat treatment

Duplex stainless steel grades  must be cooled as quickly as possible to room temperature after hot forming to avoid the precipitation of intermetallic phases (Sigma phase in particular) which drastically reduce the impact resistance at room temperature  as well as the corrosion resistance.

Alloying elements Cr, Mo, W, Si increase the stability and the formation of intermetallic phases. Therefore super duplex grades have a higher hot working temperature range and require faster cooling rates than the lean duplex grades.

Applications of duplex stainless steels 
Duplex stainless steels are usually selected for their high mechanical properties and good to very high corrosion resistance (particularly to stress corrosion cracking).

 Architecture
 Stockholm's waterfront building 
 Louvre Abu Dhabi
 La Sagrada Familia
 Infrastructure:
 Helix Bridge, Singapore 
 Cala Galdana bridge 
Hong Kong–Zhuhai–Macau bridge and undersea tunnel 
 sea walls, piers, etc.
 tunnels
 Oil and Gas:
 a wide range of equipment: flowlines, manifolds, risers, pumps, valves, etc.
 Pulp and Paper:
 digesters, pressure vessels, liquor tanks, etc.
 Chemical engineering:
 pressure vessels, heat exchangers, condensers, distillation columns, agitators, marine chemical tankers, etc.
 Water:
 desalination plants, large tanks for water storage, waste water treatment 
 renewable energy: Biogas tanks
 Mobility:  tramcars and bus frames, tank trucks, iron ore wagons 
 Engineering: pumps, valves, fittings, springs, etc.

Further reading 

 TMR Stainless. Practical Guidelines for the Fabrication of Duplex Stainless Steels. 3rd ed. International Molybdenum Association (IMOA); 2014.

See also 

 Age-hardened duplex stainless steel
 Spinodal decomposition

References

Stainless steel